It was a Dacian fortified town.

References

Radovanu
Historic monuments in Călărași County